Vaikuntha Gadyam is a Sanskrit prayer written by the Hindu philosopher Ramanuja towards the end of the 11th century. It is one of the first bhakti prayers in the Sri Vaishnava school of thought and is the basis for many prayers of this style. It is recited in the 108 Divya Desam temples, including Srirangam.

Context
Ramanuja and his disciples visited the Ranganatha temple in Srirangam on Panguni Uttiram, a day in spring of the Tamil calendar month of Panguni (in spring) on the day of the ascension of the star called Uttiram. In Tamil mythology, Uttiram was in ascent when the goddess of the temple, Sri Ranganayaki Tayar, Lakshmi, was born. Ramanuja was inspired by the festivities of the day and composed Sriranga Gadyam and Sharanagati Gadyam. According to tradition, the deity Ranganatha is regarded to have been moved by these compositions, and gave Ramanuja a vision of his abode, Vaikuntha. This inspired Ramanuja to compose the Vaikuntha Gadyam.

Content

Vaikuntha Gadyam, unlike the commentaries of Ramanuja on Vedanta, does not have detailed philosophical debates. Instead, it is a pure expression of bhakti and gives a detailed description of Vaikuntha seen through the eyes of a liberated one (Mukti Jivan). Ramanuja stresses the important message that surrender to Narayana's lotus feet (Narayana Sayujyam) results in Salokyam (attaining the abode of Narayana), Sarupyam (purity of soul) and Sameepyam (remaining close to God). He glorifies the eternal Kaimkaryam (devoted work) performed by devotees like Ananta Shesha, Garuda, Vishvaksena, a devotee considered first among equals and the dvarapalakas (door keepers) to Vaikuntha, Jaya-Vijaya. He then gives a  brief glimpse of the "bountiful treasure" awaiting a devotee who does similar devotional work.

Style
The work comprises alternate long and short sentences with many adjectival phrases.

References

Sri Vaishnavism
Hindu mantras
Mantras
Vaishnava texts